DVDs of the television show Buffy the Vampire Slayer  were produced by 20th Century Fox and released beginning in 2000. As well as containing the episodes, the DVD sets have extra features such as: audio commentaries by the show's producers, documentary features, blooper reels, and shooting scripts.

Release dates

Differences between versions

The Buffy the Vampire Slayer DVD sets were released in at least three encoding formats:

 Region 1 (United States and Canada), in NTSC format
 Region 2 (Europe), in PAL format
 Region 4 (Australia and New Zealand), in PAL format

Aside from the region encoding (and the packaging), the Region 2 and Region 4 DVDs are identical.  However, there are several content differences between the Region 1 DVDs and the Region 2 and 4 DVDs.

Scenes from previous episodes 
The Region 2 and 4 DVDs include the scenes from previous episodes ("Previously on Buffy the Vampire Slayer") at the beginning of each episode (except season 2); the Region 1 DVDs do not.

This even applies to the final episode of season five, "The Gift", in which the "previously" scenes are a montage leading into the episode itself.  This montage was deleted from "The Gift" on the Region 1 DVDs.  This montage was later included as an easter egg on the Season 7 DVD set, even in Region 2 and 4.

Widescreen 
The series aired in a 4:3 aspect ratio for all seven seasons in the United States, with the exception of "Once More, with Feeling" which was aired in widescreen. While the first three seasons were shot exclusively in 4:3, beginning with the fourth season the series was shot with a 16:9 safe area, though according to Joss Whedon the series was intended to be shown in a 4:3 ratio, stating "Adding space to the sides simply for the sake of trying to look more cinematic would betray the very exact mise-en-scene I was trying to create. I am a purist, and this is the purest way to watch Buffy. I have resisted the effort to letterbox Buffy from the start and always will, because that is not the show we shot." The extra material in the widescreen versions is never important for the plot, although it gives additional views of the sets and backgrounds.

Beginning in season four, the Region 2 and 4 DVDs include an open matte 16:9 version of the television show. The Region 1 DVDs include the standard format (4:3) version.

The reason for this difference is that the Region 2 and 4 DVDs were released before the Region 1 DVDs, with less involvement from Mutant Enemy Productions. When the Region 1 DVDs were released, Joss Whedon decided that they should not have the widescreen version.

In 2011 Netflix began streaming seasons 4–7 in the 16:9 ratio, but would ultimately revert to the 4:3 ratio. In Nordic Region 2 countries Netflix streams those seasons in 4:3 ratio, despite the local DVDs being in widescreen.

As of August 4, 2016, Netflix began streaming all seven seasons in an updated HD version, replacing the original broadcast version. This version of the series is a remaster of the series in HD produced by the studio 20th Century Fox against the wishes of original production team. Many of the original production team, including Whedon himself, and fans have criticized the HD remaster for poor transferring of standard definition to high definition, the poor transition from 4:3 aspect ratio to 16:9 aspect ratio, improper lighting, lack of lens filtering and poorly redone special effects that were either upscaled or redone in HD not true to the original.  For season 1, each episode up to episode 8 had to be cropped, leaving everything in frame looking zoomed. Season 1, episode 7 has a few scenes fixed so they are using more of the frame. In other instances the 16:9 aspect ratio shows goofs in frame like crew members or filming equipment on screen. 20th Century Fox originally released the HD remaster as a syndicated broadcast on the network Pivot. Currently the HD remaster is not available for purchase on home media.

4% speed difference 
The Region 2 and 4 DVDs play the episodes at 4% faster than the Region 1 DVDs.  This reduces the running time of each episode by about two minutes (not counting the "scenes from previous episodes").  It also causes the sound to be raised by two-thirds of a semitone.  For example, a C note is raised to a note two-thirds of the way from C to C♯.

The speeds of the different region DVDs match the speeds used during the original television broadcasts in the respective countries.  Thus the Region 1 DVD plays the video at the same speed as the American broadcasts (which is the speed at which the show was filmed), while the Region 2 and 4 DVDs plays the video at the slightly faster speed that was used during the original British broadcasts.  This effect is not particular to the Buffy DVDs but affects all television shows, because film that uses 23.976 frames per second is sped up for PAL that uses 25 (in the 30fps NTSC standard it is subject to 3:2 pulldown and there is no speed variation).  But since the signal from a DVD player is ultimately analog, the Region 2 and 4 DVDs will still play at the faster speed when played on an American television with a multi-region DVD.

In Brazil the standard color system is not PAL, but PAL-M which is also 24 frames per second. In addition to that, all DVD releases, despite being Region 4 are in NTSC, so the frame rate is also 24 frames per second.

Subtitles 
In the Region 2 and 4 releases, episodes with commentaries include two English subtitles:  the show itself, and the commentary.  The Region 1 releases do not offer subtitles for the commentaries.

The Region 1 DVDs also offer a smaller choice of non-English languages subtitles than the Region 2 and 4 DVDs.

Season 1

Disc 1

Episodes
 Episode 1: "Welcome to the Hellmouth"
 Episode 2: "The Harvest"
 Episode 3: "Witch"
 Episode 4: "Teacher's Pet"

Special features
 Interview with Joss Whedon and David Boreanaz
 Interview with Joss Whedon on "Welcome To The Hellmouth" & "The Harvest" (Region 1 Only)
 Commentary on "Welcome to the Hellmouth" and "The Harvest" by creator Joss Whedon
 Original pilot episode script "Welcome To The Hellmouth" & "The Harvest"
 Buffy trailer
 DVD-ROM content, screensavers and Buffy weblinks

Disc 2

Episodes
 Episode 5: "Never Kill a Boy on the First Date"
 Episode 6: "The Pack"
 Episode 7: "Angel"
 Episode 8: "I, Robot... You, Jane"

Special features
 "I Quit" music video (absent in Region 1 release)
 Interview with Joss Whedon on "Witch" & "Never Kill A Boy on the First Date"  (Region 1 only)
 Photo gallery

Disc 3

Episodes
 Episode 9: "The Puppet Show"
 Episode 10: "Nightmares"
 Episode 11: "Out of Mind, Out of Sight"
 Episode 12: "Prophecy Girl"

Special features
 Interview with Joss Whedon on "Angel" & "The Puppet Show" (Region 1 only)
 Cast biographies

Season 2

Disc 1

Episodes
 Episode 1: "When She Was Bad"
 Episode 2: "Some Assembly Required"
 Episode 3: "School Hard"
 Episode 4: "Inca Mummy Girl"

Disc 2

Episodes
 Episode 5: "Reptile Boy"
 Episode 6: "Halloween"
 Episode 7: "Lie to Me"
 Episode 8: "The Dark Age"

Special features
 Commentary on "Reptile Boy" by writer/director David Greenwalt
 Script for "Reptile Boy"

Disc 3

Episodes
 Episode 9: "What's My Line, Part One"
 Episode 10: "What's My Line, Part Two"
 Episode 11: "Ted"
 Episode 12: "Bad Eggs"

Special features
 Commentary on "What's My Line, Parts One and Two" by co-writer Marti Noxon
 Script for "What's My Line, Parts One and Two"

Disc 4

Episodes
 Episode 13: "Surprise"
 Episode 14: "Innocence"
 Episode 15: "Phases"
 Episode 16: "Bewitched, Bothered and Bewildered"

Special features
 Commentary on "Innocence" by writer/director Joss Whedon
 Script for "Innocence"
 Interview with creator Joss Whedon on "Surprise" and "Innocence" (Region 1 only)

Disc 5

Episodes
 Episode 17: "Passion"
 Episode 18: "Killed by Death"
 Episode 19: "I Only Have Eyes for You"
 Episode 20: "Go Fish"

Special features
 Interview with creator Joss Whedon on "Passion" and "I Only Have Eyes for You" (Region 1 only)

Disc 6

Episodes
 Episode 21: "Becoming, Part One"
 Episode 22: "Becoming, Part Two"

Special features
 "Designing Buffy" featurette
 "A Buffy Bestiary" featurette
 "Beauty and the Beasts" featurette
 Interview with creator Joss Whedon on "Becoming, Parts One and Two" (Region 1 only)
 Trailers (UK TV spots, U.S. TV spots, Season 2 DVD trailers)
 Cast biographies
 Stills/photos (set designs, monsters, additional photos)

Season 3

Disc 1

Episodes
 Episode 1: "Anne"
 Episode 2: "Dead Man's Party"
 Episode 3: "Faith, Hope & Trick"
 Episode 4: "Beauty and the Beasts"

Special features
 Script for "Faith, Hope & Trick"

Disc 2

Episodes
 Episode 5: "Homecoming"
 Episode 6: "Band Candy"
 Episode 7: "Revelations"
 Episode 8: "Lovers Walk"

Special features
 Script for "Band Candy"
 Script for "Lovers Walk"

Disc 3

Episodes
 Episode 9: "The Wish"
 Episode 10: "Amends"
 Episode 11: "Gingerbread"

Special features
 Script for "The Wish"
 "Season 3 Overview" featurette
 "Buffy Speak" featurette
 Photo stills gallery
 Cast biographies (non Region 1)

Disc 4

Episodes
 Episode 12: "Helpless"
 Episode 13: "The Zeppo"
 Episode 14: "Bad Girls"
 Episode 15: "Consequences"

Special features
 Commentary on "Helpless" by writer David Fury
 Commentary on "Bad Girls" by writer Doug Petrie
 Commentary on "Consequences" by director Michael Gershman
 Interview with creator Joss Whedon on "Bad Girls" and "Consequences" (Region 1 only)

Disc 5

Episodes
 Episode 16: "Doppelgangland"
 Episode 17: "Enemies"
 Episode 18: "Earshot"
 Episode 19: "Choices"

Special features
 Commentary on "Earshot" by writer Jane Espenson
 Interview with Joss Whedon, Jane Espenson, and Doug Petrie on "Enemies" and "Earshot" (Region 1 only)

Disc 6

Episodes
 Episode 20: "The Prom"
 Episode 21: "Graduation Day, Part One"
 Episode 22: "Graduation Day, Part Two"

Special features
 "Special Effects" featurette
 "Weapons" featurette
 "Wardrobe" featurette
 Interview with Joss Whedon on "Graduation Day" (Region 1 only)

Season 4

Disc 1

Episodes
 Episode 1: "The Freshman"
 Episode 2: "Living Conditions"
 Episode 3: "The Harsh Light of Day"
 Episode 4: "Fear, Itself"

Special features
 Script for "Fear, Itself"

Disc 2

Episodes
 Episode 5: "Beer Bad"
 Episode 6: "Wild at Heart"
 Episode 7: "The Initiative"
 Episode 8: "Pangs"

Special features
 Commentary on "Wild at Heart" by creator Joss Whedon, writer Marti Noxon and actor Seth Green (Region 1 only)
 Commentary on "The Initiative" by writer Doug Petrie

Disc 3

Episodes
 Episode 9: "Something Blue"
 Episode 10: "Hush"
 Episode 11: "Doomed"

Special features
 Commentary on "Hush" by writer/director Joss Whedon
 Script for "Hush"
 "Spike Me" featurette
 "Oz Revelations: A Full Moon" featurette (Region 1 only)
 "Buffy, Inside Sets of Sunnydale" featurette
 "Buffy, Inside the Music" featurette
 "Hush" featurette
 Cast biographies

Disc 4

Episodes
 Episode 12: "A New Man"
 Episode 13: "The I in Team"
 Episode 14: "Goodbye Iowa"
 Episode 15: "This Year's Girl"

Special features
 Commentary on "This Year's Girl" by writer Doug Petrie

Disc 5

Episodes
 Episode 16: "Who Are You"
 Episode 17: "Superstar"
 Episode 18: "Where the Wild Things Are"
 Episode 19: "New Moon Rising"

Special features
 Script for "Who Are You"
 Commentary on "Superstar" by writer Jane Espenson

Disc 6

Episodes
 Episode 20: "The Yoko Factor"
 Episode 21: "Primeval"
 Episode 22: "Restless"

Special features
 Commentary on "Primeval" by writer David Fury and director James A. Contner
 Commentary on "Restless" by writer/director Joss Whedon
 Script for "Restless"
 "Season 4 Overview" featurette
 Still gallery

Season 5

Disc 1

Episodes
 Episode 1: "Buffy vs. Dracula"
 Episode 2: "Real Me"
 Episode 3: "The Replacement"
 Episode 4: "Out of My Mind"

Special features
 Commentary on "Real Me" by writer David Fury and director David Grossman
 Script for "The Replacement"

Disc 2

Episodes
 Episode 5: "No Place Like Home"
 Episode 6: "Family"
 Episode 7: "Fool for Love"
 Episode 8: "Shadow"

Special features
 Commentary on "Fool for Love" by writer Doug Petrie
 Script for "Fool For Love"

Disc 3

Episodes
 Episode 9: "Listening to Fear"
 Episode 10: "Into the Woods"
 Episode 11: "Triangle"

Special features
 Script for "Into the Woods"
 "Buffy Abroad" featurette
 "Demonology: A Slayer's Guide" featurette
 "Casting Buffy" featurette
 "Action Heroes!: The Stunts of Buffy" featurette
 Buffy series outtakes

Disc 4

Episodes
 Episode 12: "Checkpoint"
 Episode 13: "Blood Ties"
 Episode 14: "Crush"
 Episode 15: "I Was Made to Love You"

Special features
 Script for "Checkpoint"
 Commentary on "I Was Made to Love You" by writer Jane Espenson

Disc 5

Episodes
 Episode 16: "The Body"
 Episode 17: "Forever"
 Episode 18: "Intervention"
 Episode 19: "Tough Love"

Special features
 Commentary on "The Body" by writer/director Joss Whedon

Disc 6

Episodes
 Episode 20: "Spiral"
 Episode 21: "The Weight of the World"
 Episode 22: "The Gift"

Special features
 "The Story of Season 5" featurette
 "Natural Causes" featurette
 "Spotlight on Dawn" featurette
 Still gallery
 Buffy videogame trailer
 DVD-ROM Buffy demon guide

Season 6

Disc 1

Episodes
 Episode 1: "Bargaining, Part One"
 Episode 2: "Bargaining, Part Two"
 Episode 3: "After Life"
 Episode 4: "Flooded"

Special features
 Commentary on "Bargaining, Parts One and Two" by writers Marti Noxon and David Fury

Disc 2

Episodes
 Episode 5: "Life Serial"
 Episode 6: "All the Way"
 Episode 7: "Once More, with Feeling"
 Episode 8: "Tabula Rasa"

Special features
 Commentary on "Once More, with Feeling" by writer/director Joss Whedon
 Behind the scenes featurette on "Once More, with Feeling"
 "I've Got a Theory/Bunnies/If We're Together" karaoke music video
 "I'll Never Tell" karaoke music video
 "Walk Through the Fire" karaoke music video
 Easter egg

Disc 3

Episodes
 Episode 9: "Smashed"
 Episode 10: "Wrecked"
 Episode 11: "Gone"

Special features
 Commentary on "Smashed" by writer Drew Greenberg
 Academy of Television Arts and Sciences Panel Discussion

Disc 4

Episodes
 Episode 12: "Doublemeat Palace"
 Episode 13: "Dead Things"
 Episode 14: "Older and Far Away"
 Episode 15: "As You Were"

Special features
 "Buffy Gets a Job" featurette on "Doublemeat Palace"

Disc 5

Episodes
 Episode 16: "Hell's Bells"
 Episode 17: "Normal Again"
 Episode 18: "Entropy"
 Episode 19: "Seeing Red"

Special features
 Commentary on "Hell's Bells" by director David Solomon and writer Rebecca Rand Kirshner
 Commentary on "Normal Again" by director Rick Rosenthal and writer Diego Gutierrez
 Easter egg

Disc 6

Episodes
 Episode 20: "Villains"
 Episode 21: "Two to Go"
 Episode 22: "Grave"

Special features
 Commentary on "Grave" by director James A. Contner and writer David Fury
 "Life is the Big Bad – Season Six Overview"
 "Buffy the Vampire Slayer: Television with a Bite" documentary from A&E Network's Biography series
 Outtakes
 DVD-ROM Buffy Demon Guide

Season 7

Disc 1

Episodes
 Episode 1: "Lessons"
 Episode 2: "Beneath You"
 Episode 3: "Same Time, Same Place"
 Episode 4: "Help"

Special features
 Commentary on "Lessons" by writer Joss Whedon and director David Solomon
 "Willow Demon Guide" DVD-ROM content

Disc 2

Episodes
 Episode 5: "Selfless"
 Episode 6: "Him"
 Episode 7: "Conversations with Dead People"
 Episode 8: "Sleeper"

Special features
 Commentary on "Selfless" by director David Solomon and writer Drew Goddard
 Commentary on "Conversations with Dead People" by director Nick Marck, writers Jane Espenson and Drew Goddard, and actors Danny Strong and Tom Lenk

Disc 3

Episodes
 Episode 9: "Never Leave Me"
 Episode 10: "Bring on the Night"
 Episode 11: "Showtime"

Special features
 "Buffy: It's Always Been About the Fans" featurette

Disc 4

Episodes
 Episode 12: "Potential"
 Episode 13: "The Killer in Me"
 Episode 14: "First Date"
 Episode 15: "Get It Done"

Special features
 Commentary on "The Killer in Me" by director David Solomon and writer Drew Greenberg

Disc 5

Episodes
 Episode 16: "Storyteller"
 Episode 17: "Lies My Parents Told Me"
 Episode 18: "Dirty Girls"
 Episode 19: "Empty Places"

Special features
 Commentary on "Lies My Parents Told Me" by co-writer/director David Fury, co-writer Drew Goddard, and actors James Marsters and D. B. Woodside
 Commentary on "Dirty Girls" by writer Drew Goddard and actor Nicholas Brendon

Disc 6

Episodes
 Episode 20: "Touched"
 Episode 21: "End of Days"
 Episode 22: "Chosen"

Special features
 Commentary on "Chosen" by writer/director Joss Whedon
 "Season 7 Overview – Buffy: Full Circle" featurette
 "Buffy 101: Studying the Slayer" featurette
 "Generation S" featurette
 "The Last Sundown" featurette
 Outtakes reel
 Buffy wraps
 Easter egg

Collections

The Region 1 Buffy 40-disc boxed set includes a note from Joss Whedon as well as an extra disc (the 40th) with exclusive special features:

 Back to the Hellmouth: A Conversation with Creators and Cast – with Joss Whedon, Marti Noxon, David Fury, Drew Goddard, Jane Espenson, Nicholas Brendon, Charisma Carpenter, Emma Caulfield, and Danny Strong
 Breaking Barriers: It's Not a Chick Fight Thing
 Love Bites: Relationships in the Buffyverse
 Evil Fiends
 Buffy: An Unlikely Role Model
 Buffy Cast and Crew: Favorite Episodes

A repackaged 39-disc version was released on October 12, 2010, excluding the extra disc of bonus features.

Slimmer versions
The entire series was re-released on DVD in 2006, in a "slimmer" package with the same bonus materials that were featured in the original fold out versions.  Even "slimmer" versions were issued in 2008.

Thematic releases
Two special Region 1 DVD releases contain assorted episodes from various seasons:

 Spike: Love is Hell (October 2005)
This single-disc release includes four Spike-related episodes: "School Hard", "Lie to Me", "Lovers Walk" and "Fool for Love", as well as a special feature on the character.
 The Curse of the Hellmouth (September 2006)
A two-disc set that contains eight Sunnydale-related episodes: "The Pack", "Halloween", "Passion", "The Wish", "Helpless", "Fear, Itself", "Hush" and "Same Time, Same Place", as well as a short supplemental featurette.

In Region 2, there have been several single-disc releases named after individual characters from the show, under the overarching title of "The Slayer Collection". Each contains four episodes and a character profile. The Spike-centric DVD contains the same episodes as the Region 1 "Love is Hell" collection. Other discs focus on Willow, Xander, Giles, Cordelia, Dawn, Angel, and Faith.

Two other single-disc Region 2 DVDs have been released. The first is titled "The Very Best of...". It contains these four episodes: "Becoming, Part One", "Graduation Day, Part Two", "Hush", and "The Gift". The second contains the episode "Once More, with Feeling" and a number of special features including a featurette on season 1 of Angel and a featurette titled "Buffy, Inside the Music".

In October 2008, a limited edition bonus DVD was made available exclusively to the retail chain Best Buy. The Region 1 85-minute DVD documents the 2008 Buffy Reunion at the Paley Festival, filmed on March 20, 2008. The DVD features interviews with Amber Benson, Nicholas Brendon, Charisma Carpenter, Emma Caulfield, Sarah Michelle Gellar, Seth Green, David Greenwalt, James Marsters, Michelle Trachtenberg & Joss Whedon.  The DVD is available on Amazon and manufactured on-demand using DVD-R media.

See also 
List of Angel home video releases

References

 The DVD sets themselves
 "Buffy DVD and VHS" Bbc.co.uk (2004). Reveals UK release dates.
 "DVD details for Buffy the Vampire Slayer" Imdb (2006).

Home video releases
Lists of home video releases